The Pink Friday: Reloaded Tour was the second concert tour and debut arena tour by Trinidadian recording artist Nicki Minaj to support her second studio album Pink Friday: Roman Reloaded and its re-release Pink Friday: Roman Reloaded – The Re-Up. It followed her first concert tour, Pink Friday Tour, which was extended with the Reloaded Tour due to high demands with fans wanting her to tour their cities.

This tour was a more grand production than the Pink Friday Tour. Amendments included a more theatrical show, a bigger set, bigger stage, more dancers, and it was much more synchronized including a storyline and video content. Nicki stated that this tour will be like her "Pink Friday Tour on steroids." With the tour kicking off in Nottingham, England, the tour received generally favorable reviews from critics, praising the vibe and production of the tour. But as it kicked off, the tour also managed to generate some controversy.

Background and development
It was announced via Minaj's Twitter account that British singer-songwriter and the UK's X Factor semi-finalist Misha B, will be opening for her in the United Kingdom and that Tyga, Nicki's Young Money label mate, would be an opening act for the European leg for this tour as well.

On August 1, 2012, Minaj announced that the tour would start later than planned and this would affect the October dates in Australia, Paris, the Netherlands, Switzerland, and Belgium. Minaj said the reason she had to postpone these dates were because she was working on a "secret project," later revealed to be American Idol and international scheduling conflicts that would also effect Nicki's European dates. Live Nation.com officially announced the rescheduled dates for the Oceania leg for the Reloaded Tour August 6, 2012 on their website.

Tyga, who is the opening act for both Australia and New Zealand announced that he cancelled his appearance in New Zealand. Live Nation Entertainment, who sponsored the tour announced via their Twitter that Tyga was unable to attend the concert. They confirmed he was unable to attend due to complications with travel arrangements, and that his touring party did not manage to be there in time for the concert. He apologized the same night, but Live Nation confirmed he would continue to tour Australia. New Zealand artist Zowie and DJ Tim Phin replaced him for the performance.

Controversies
Minaj kicked off her tour in Nottingham, England for her first concert off the tour. While performing her song "Va Va Voom" in Nottingham, Minaj suffered a wardrobe malfunction where one of her breasts had slipped out of her bustier. She sported pasties the following night, in Manchester, similar to those she wore on The Tonight Show with Jay Leno in July.

Critical reception

The tour received generally positive reviews. For the opening of the tour, This Is Nottingham gave the tour a mixed review. They praised the opening acts along with the dancers and production settings, but didn't give it a positive nor negative review towards Minaj. They noted Minaj's late progress in the show, with her DJ "d[oing] his best to fill, but his call-and-response routines did wear thin at times." Because of this, they noted the DJ's were "running out of tricks", due to her amount of late progress. However, overall they stated "If Nicki Minaj can hold onto that realness and nurture her on-stage connection with her ever-loving fanbase, even as the venues grow in size, then her biggest tour to date could just turn out to be her greatest triumph yet." Sutherland Echo reviewed her Newcastle performance positively. Katy Wheeler from the publication stated she delivered an "electrifying" performance and stated "With all the madcap bouffants, crazy clothing and cartoon-esque faces, it's easy to forget that Nicki actually has a cracking voice [...] But it shone as she worked her way through a catalogue of infectiously good hits to the backdrop of a slick and expensive-looking set.
André Paine from Standard awarded the performance at the O2 Arena, London, four stars out of five, praising her performance and vocal ability, with songs "Fire Burns", "Beez in the Trap", and "Super Bass" as being examples.

For the opening of the Australasian leg, the tour received favorable reviews. Jess Etheridge from Stuff.co.nz reviewed her New Zealand concert, and gave it a positive review. She described her rapping structure and techniques "electrifying and breathtaking." She also praised her "interactions with the crowd showed how funny and natural she is, which was refreshing." However, she did point out her "Long costume changes without any entertainment on stage, such as dancers, made the show feel disjointed and slowed the momentum." However, Damien Grant from The New Zealand Herald also reviewed the same location, and gave it a mixed-to-favorable review. First, he was critical on her performance because he felt that the audience wanted Roman (Minaj's alter ego) and said that when they heard Nicki than Roman "they were ecstatic." He also felt that most songs were "truncated" and felt that the production "drowned her." However, he was positive towards her rapping and vocal delivery and stated it was a "good night, but was too short" and concluded "Engaging but not enthralling." However, Shandelle Battersb from the same publication reviewed the same place and gave it a positive review, writing "Minaj delivered an almost perfect pop show, high in theatrics with excellent stage effects – including some alarmingly large fireballs – and dripping with diversity and talent."

Opening acts
Tyga
Young Rich
Misha B

Setlist
This setlist is representative of the show in Brisbane. It does not represent all concerts during the tour.

"Come on a Cone"
"Roman Reloaded"
"Beez in the Trap"
"Did It On'em"
"Up All Night" / "Make Me Proud"
"Moment 4 Life"
"The Boys"
"Muny" / "Raining Men" / "Dance (A$$)" 
"Va Va Voom"
"Super Bass"
"Right Thru Me"
"Fire Burns"
"Save Me"
"Marilyn Monroe"
"Automatic"
"Pound the Alarm"
"Turn Me On"
"Take It to the Head" / "Mercy" / "Monster" / "Hold Yuh" / "Letting Go (Dutty Love)" / "Bottoms Up" / "Out of My Mind" / "I Luv Dem Strippers" 
"Roman Holiday"
"Roman's Revenge"
"My Chick Bad" / "Go Hard" / "Itty Bitty Piggy"
"Freedom"
"I'm Legit"
Encore
"Starships"

Tour dates

Rescheduled shows

Personnel
 Dancers – Sara Bivens, Jae Fusz, Anthony Garza, Tiffany Simon, Cara Horibe, Karen Chuang, Kelsey Park, and George Jones
 Background singers – LeKeisha Renee Lewis and Candace Marie Wakefield
 Choreographers – Laurieann Gibson, Young Rich, Onika Maraj, and George Jones Jr
 Creative design – Onika Maraj, Josh Thomas and Laurieann Gibson
 DJs – DJ Headache (Main) and DJ Tim Phin (Select dates)

Notes

External links
Minaj's Official Website

References

2012 concert tours
Nicki Minaj
Nicki Minaj concert tours